Gunnsteinn Skúlason (born 31 October 1947) is an Icelandic former handball player who competed in the 1972 Summer Olympics.

References

1947 births
Living people
Gunnsteinn Skulason
Gunnsteinn Skulason
Handball players at the 1972 Summer Olympics